Graham is a city in Appling County, Georgia, United States. The population was 291 at the 2010 census.

History
The community was named after J. H. Graham, an early settler.

The city of Graham was incorporated locally in 1897. Graham was officially granted a charter by the state legislature in 1991.

Geography
Graham is located at  (31.832940, -82.503631).

Demographics

As of the census of 2000, there were 312 people, 120 households, and 90 families residing in the city. The racial makeup of the city was 52.88% White, 45.83% African American, 0.96% from other races, and 0.32% from two or more races. Hispanic or Latino of any race were 0.96% of the population.

There were 120 households, out of which 33.3% had children under the age of 18 living with them, 54.2% were married couples living together, 12.5% had a female householder with no husband present, and 25.0% were non-families. 22.5% of all households were made up of individuals, and 5.0% had someone living alone who was 65 years of age or older.  The average household size was 2.60 and the average family size was 3.07.

In the city, the population was spread out, with 27.9% under the age of 18, 6.4% from 18 to 24, 27.6% from 25 to 44, 27.2% from 45 to 64, and 10.9% who were 65 years of age or older.  The median age was 36 years. For every 100 females, there were 97.5 males.  For every 100 females age 18 and over, there were 104.5 males.

The median income for a household in the city was $28,438, and the median income for a family was $30,909. Males had a median income of $26,667 versus $20,000 for females. The per capita income for the city was $14,270.  About 20.0% of families and 24.4% of the population were below the poverty line, including 27.3% of those under age 18 and 25.0% of those age 65 or over.

External links

References

Cities in Georgia (U.S. state)
Cities in Appling County, Georgia